Filip Dvořák (born 30 July 1988, in Prague) is a Czech sprint canoeist and marathon canoeist. At the 2012 Summer Olympics, he competed in the Men's C-2 1000 metres, together with Jaroslav Radoň, finishing 5th.  Dvořák and Radoň also won two bronzes at the 2013 World Championships.  At the 2016 Olympics, the pair again competed in the C-2 1000 m.

He is grandson of Bedřich Dvořák and son of Libor Dvořák.

References

External links
 
 

Czech male canoeists
Olympic canoeists of the Czech Republic
Canoeists at the 2012 Summer Olympics
Canoeists at the 2016 Summer Olympics
1988 births
Living people
Canoeists from Prague
Canoeists at the 2015 European Games
European Games competitors for the Czech Republic
Universiade medalists in canoeing
Universiade silver medalists for the Czech Republic
Medalists at the 2013 Summer Universiade